Viktor Shvaiko (or Victor Shvaiko; born 1965) is a Russian artist whose work has been shown in various galleries across the world. He was born in Altai, Russia. He exhibited around Russia up until 1991 where he fled to Italy, through Yugoslavia during the confusion of the civil war there. His forte is in painting cafés from areas around Italy, France and the rest of Europe, with a great sense of lighting and shadows in his evening and morning paintings.

Works
Twilight at Troyes – May 1998

External links
Official website

References

Living people
1965 births
20th-century Russian painters
Russian male painters
21st-century Russian painters
20th-century Russian male artists
21st-century Russian male artists